João Fonseca (born 21 August 2006) is a Brazilian tennis player.

Fonseca has a career high ATP singles ranking of 826 achieved on 16 January 2023. He also has a career high ATP doubles ranking of 806 achieved on 21 November 2022.

He made his ATP main-draw debut at the 2023 Rio Open after receiving a wildcard for the singles main draw and also appeared in the doubles main draw, entering as lucky losers with Mateus Alves.

Fonseca reached the final of the 2023 Australian Open – Boys' doubles tournament with Alexander Blockx.

Junior Grand Slam finals

Doubles: 1 (1 runner-up)

References

External links

2006 births
Living people
Brazilian male tennis players